Norma Cinotti (born 11 September 1996) is an Italian professional footballer who plays as a midfielder for Serie A club AS Roma and the Italy women's national team.

Club career
Cinotti started her career with Italian top flight side Firenze, where she suffered relegation to the Italian second tier. In 2015, she signed for Empoli in the Italian second tier. In 2018, Cinotti signed for French second tier club ASPTT Albi.

Before the second half of 2018–19, Cinotti signed for Anderlecht in the Belgian top flight, helping them win the league. In 2019, she returned to Italian top flight team Empoli.

References

External links
 Norma Cinotti at playmakerstats.com

1996 births
ASPTT Albi players
Women's association football midfielders
Expatriate women's footballers in Belgium
Expatriate women's footballers in France
Italian expatriate sportspeople in Belgium
Italian expatriate sportspeople in France
Italian women's footballers
Italy women's international footballers
Living people
RSC Anderlecht (women) players
Serie A (women's football) players
S.S.D. Empoli Ladies FBC players